"(She's) Some Kind of Wonderful" is a song written by Canadian-American musician John Ellison and first recorded by his R&B group, Soul Brothers Six, in 1967, peaking at number 91 on the U.S. Billboard Hot 100.

The best known version is by American rock band Grand Funk Railroad from 1974 which reached number 3 on the same chart.

Grand Funk Railroad version

In 1974, American rock band Grand Funk recorded the song for the their album All the Girls in the World Beware!!!; it reached number three on the US Billboard Hot 100 on February 22, 1975. It also ranked number 6 on Billboard's Hot 100 year-end chart for 1975 as shown on the December 27, 1975, print edition of Billboard, which contained the Hot 100 for 1975. This is the official list still shown on Billboard magazine website.

Their version of the song appeared in the 2004 video game Grand Theft Auto: San Andreas on the fictitious radio station K-DST.

Other notable versions
The Fantastic Johnny C covered the song in 1968, reaching number 87 on the US Billboard Hot 100.
Joss Stone covered the song in 2003, for her debut album, The Soul Sessions.

Charts

Certifications

Grand Funk Railroad version

References

1967 songs
1967 singles
1968 singles
1974 singles
1994 singles
2002 singles
Grand Funk Railroad songs
Huey Lewis and the News songs
Toploader songs
Song recordings produced by Jimmy Ienner
Atlantic Records singles
Capitol Records singles
Elektra Records singles
S2 Records singles
The Fantastic Johnny C songs